The Minnesota Senate, District 6, is located in St. Louis County and centered on the Mesabi Iron Range. It is currently represented by Independent David Tomassoni.

List of senators

References 

Minnesota Senate districts
St. Louis County, Minnesota